Fiumicino Aeroporto railway station, or Fiumicino Airport railway station, is sited within the Leonardo da Vinci-Fiumicino Airport (IATA code: FCO) in Fiumicino, Lazio, central Italy.  Opened in 1990, the station is the southwestern terminus of the Rome–Fiumicino railway.

The airport and station are also known as Rome-Fiumicino Airport, because the airport is the main airport for Rome.

The station is managed by Rete Ferroviaria Italiana (RFI).  Train services are operated by Trenitalia.  Each company is a subsidiary of Ferrovie dello Stato (FS), Italy's state-owned rail company.
RFI classifies the station as category "Gold".

Location
Fiumicino Aeroporto railway station is situated at Via Generale Felice Santini 11–14, directly opposite Terminal 1.

Features
The station has a passenger building and train hall that houses the platforms and ticket machines.

It is equipped with three platforms, all of them for passenger service.

Train movements

The Leonardo Express is a first-class only non-stop service linking Fiumicino Aeroporto with Roma Termini railway station in approximately 30 minutes. It operates every 15 minutes from early morning until late evening.

Frequent regional trains link Fiumicino Aeroporto with destinations in Latium north of Rome, including Fara Sabina, Poggio Mirteto and Orte (terminus station for this line).  The station is also the terminus of the Ferrovie regionali del Lazio FR1 commuter service from Orte. These trains stop at all the stations along the way, including important Roman Stations as Roma Trastevere, Roma Ostiense and Roma Tiburtina. While from last two it is possible to commute to the Linea B subway line, in Roma Trastevere the Tram 8 (with one terminus at Largo di Torre Argentina) provides a fast connection with Trastevere and the heart of the city center.

During business hours on workdays a train every 15 minutes arrives to Fara Sabina: of these, a train every 30 minutes reaches Poggio Mirteto, and from this station a train every hour arrives to Orte.

The station is also served by direct Frecciargento and Frecciarossa services to destinations such as Florence, Bologna and Venice.

See also

FL1 (Lazio regional railways)
History of rail transport in Italy
List of railway stations in Lazio
Rail transport in Italy
Railway stations in Italy

References

External links

Airport railway stations in Italy
Fiumicino
Railway stations in Lazio
Railway stations opened in 1990
Transport in Rome
1990 establishments in Italy
Railway stations in Italy opened in the 20th century